The Coach and Horses at 29 Greek Street on the corner with Romilly Street in Soho, London, is a grade II listed public house.

In the 20th century the pub became notable for its association with the columnist Jeffrey Bernard, the staff of Private Eye magazine, other journalists and as a haunt for Soho personalities. Through their writings its former landlord, Norman Balon, became known as "London's rudest landlord".

Early history
There has been a pub on the site since the 18th century. The current building dates from the early 19th century and is Grade II listed with Historic England.

20th century
In the 20th century, the landlord for over 60 years was Norman Balon, who developed a persona as "London's rudest landlord". He began to work at the pub in 1943, when he left an engineering course to serve at the bar, after his father became the landlord there.

The pub became a favourite drinking spot for the journalists of the satirical magazine Private Eye and the location of their fortnightly lunches, at which it was hoped a plentiful supply of cheap wine would prompt an indiscretion from one of the guests, such as member of parliament John Hemming's admission that he had got his mistress pregnant. It also featured regularly in The Spectator'''s "Low Life" column by Jeffrey Bernard, who was a regular at the pub until his death in 1997.

In 1989, the interior of the pub was recreated on stage for the biographical play about Bernard, Jeffrey Bernard Is Unwell. The play was successful, and Balon's memoirs followed in 1991, titled You're Barred, You Bastards: The Memoirs of a Soho Publican''.

Clive Jennings says of regular clientele such as Bernard that "the lethal triangle of The French, The Coach & Horses and The Colony were the staging points of the Dean Street shuffle, with occasional forays into other joints such as The Gargoyle or the Mandrake ... The Groucho or Blacks".

21st century
Norman Balon was succeeded as landlord in May 2006 by Alastair Choat, Greg Stewart, and Melanie Krudy. In 2019, Fullers ended the lease with Alastair Choat and transferred the pub into its managed estate.

Notable patrons
Francis Bacon
The Beatles
Jeffrey Bernard
Tom Baker
John Hurt
Danny Kirwan
Eddie Linden
George Melly
Keith Waterhouse
Peter Cook

References 

19th-century establishments in England
Buildings and structures completed in the 19th century
Grade II listed pubs in the City of Westminster
Pubs in Soho
Tourist attractions in the City of Westminster
Greek Street